Melba Rae Toombs, known professionally as Melba Rae ( in Willard, Utah – December 29, 1971 in Manhattan) was an American soap opera actress.

Career
Rae acted in early daytime television, playing the wife of the couple next door on Search for Tomorrow for 20 years — from its inception in 1951 until her untimely death of a cerebral hemorrhage at New York Hospital.  Her character, Marge Bergman, was best friends with the main character of the series, Joanne (played by Mary Stuart).

Personal life
Rae, a lifelong member of the Church of Jesus Christ of Latter-day Saints was married to Gilbert Shawn from September 2, 1955, until her death. The couple had a son and daughter. Their son, Eric Shawn, became a reporter for Fox News Channel. Gilbert Shawn moved to Orlando, Florida later in life, where he died at the age of 84.

Death
On December 29, 1971, Rae died of a cerebral hemorrhage at New York Hospital in New York City, aged 49.

References

External links
 
 https://www.findagrave.com/memorial/70660588/melba-rae-shawn

American soap opera actresses
Actresses from Utah
1917 births
1971 deaths
American Latter Day Saints
20th-century American actresses
People from Willard, Utah